Chi-Won Yoon (born 2 June 1959) is a South Korean financier and executive. Formerly president of UBS Group Asia Pacific, he stepped down in 2016 after nearly seven years in the position to take a sabbatical.

He was also a member of the board of UBS Securities Co. Ltd. and chair of the Asian Executive Board of the MIT Sloan School of Management.

Education
Yoon studied electrical engineering at the Massachusetts Institute of Technology, where he graduated with a bachelor's degree in 1982 and with a Master in Management in 1986 from the MIT Sloan School of Management.

Career
Yoon's career in financial services began after his graduation in 1986. He worked for Merrill Lynch in New York City and for Lehman Brothers in New York and in Hong Kong.

In 1997, Yoon joined UBS as Head of Equity Derivatives. He began to oversee Asian Equities in 2004. In March 2008, he was appointed Head of UBS Securities Business at UBS Hong Kong, replacing Kathryn Shih. From June 2009 until November 2010, he served as CEO and Chairman of UBS AG Asia Pacific, succeeding Rory Tapner. From November 2010 he held the position of co-CEO and co-Chairman, and in March 2012 he was appointed again as sole CEO of UBS Group Asia Pacific. His role in the APAC region involves leading UBS Wealth Management, Investment Banking and Asset Management.

Yoon also worked as an electrical engineer in satellite communications, conducting research work on satellite communications at NASA.

Other activities
Before stepping down, he was in the board of directors of UBS Securities Co. Ltd and in the UBS Group Executive Board since June 2009. Yoon holds the position of Chairman of the Asian Executive Board for the MIT Sloan School of Management and is a member of the advisory board of the MIT Golub Center for Finance and Policy.

References

External links
 Profile on UBS' website
 Opening speech from Greater China Conference 2015 on YouTube

1959 births
South Korean chief executives
Living people
MIT School of Engineering alumni
MIT Sloan School of Management alumni
South Korean expatriates in Hong Kong
South Korean expatriates in the United States
Merrill (company) people
Lehman Brothers people
UBS people
NASA people
Electrical engineers